Oreophryne kapisa is a species of frog in the family Microhylidae. It is endemic to the Indonesian islands Biak and Supiori, northwest of New Guinea. Common name Kapisa's cross frog has been proposed for it.

Oreophryne kapisa occurs in swamps, cultivated areas with fairly dry conditions, and remote tropical forests. It presumably  has direct development (i.e., there is no free-living larval stage), like other Oreophryne.

Oreophryne kapisa is assumed to be a common species within its small range. It also appears to tolerate some habitat modification, and is therefore not considered threatened.

References

kapisa
Amphibians of Indonesia
Endemic fauna of the Biak–Numfoor rain forests
Schouten Islands
Amphibians described in 2003
Taxonomy articles created by Polbot